Hector Seymour Peter Monro, Baron Monro of Langholm, AE, PC (4 October 1922 – 30 August 2006), was a Scottish Conservative and Unionist Party politician. He was Member of Parliament for Dumfriesshire for over 32 years, from 1964 to 1997, and then a life peer in the House of Lords.

After piloting flying boats in the Second World War, Monro became a farmer in his native Dumfriesshire.  He became active in local test politics in the 1950s, and was elected as MP for Dumfries in 1964.  He served as a Conservative whip and held three junior ministerial positions, twice in the Scottish Office and once as Minister for Sport in the Department for the Environment.  He became a member of the House of Lords in 1997, after he stood down from the House of Commons.  He was particularly concerned with Scottish and rural issues, the RAF, and sport, and was noted for his strong links with his constituency. He was in office at the time of the Lockerbie Disaster in 1988, which occurred in his constituency.

Early and private life
Monro was born in Edinburgh and raised at Craigcleuch near Langholm in Dumfriesshire.  His father, Alistair Monro, was a captain in the Cameron Highlanders; his maternal grandfather was Lieutenant General Sir Spencer Ewart.   Monro was educated at Upland House School in Sussex, Canford School in Dorset, and King's College, Cambridge.

He was a member of the Cambridge University Air Squadron at Cambridge.  After only one year at Cambridge, he joined the RAF in 1941, becoming a flight lieutenant in Coastal Command, flying Atlantic patrols in Short Sunderland flying boats and then in the Far East in Catalinas.
  
After he was demobbed in 1946, he became a farmer at Kirtlebridge near Lockerbie, although he also had other business interests.  He remained a member of the Royal Auxiliary Air Force from 1947 to 1954.  He was later an honorary Air Commodore from 1982 to 2000, and its honorary Inspector General from 1990 to 2000.

Monro married twice.  He married Anne Welch in 1949.  Their two sons joined the British Army.  Seymour retired as a major-general; Hughie is a retired brigadier.  Monro's first wife died in 1994; later that year, he married a second time, to Doris Kaestner, a friend of his first wife. Monro's grandson, Ander Monro, has played for the Canada national rugby union team.

Political career
Monro was elected as a Dumfries County Councillor from 1952, where he served until 1967.  He was chairman and vice-president of the Dumfries Unionist Party and was elected MP for Dumfries in the 1964 general election, retaining his seat until he retired at the 1997 general election.

He became a Conservative whip in 1968, and was a Parliamentary Under Secretary of State at the Scottish Office between 28 July 1971 and 28 February 1974.  He voted against his party on Scottish devolution, announcing his support for a Scottish Assembly in 1974.

After the Conservatives lost the February 1974 general election, he was an opposition spokesman, initially on Scottish affairs and then on sport, until 1979.  After the 1979 general election, he was appointed as Margaret Thatcher's first Minister for Sport, as Parliamentary Under Secretary of State at the Department of the Environment under Michael Heseltine.  He also had responsibility for some environmental issues, and was involved in strengthening the provisions of the Wildlife and Countryside Act 1981.

Monro came under some criticism for opposing the visit of a South African Barbarians rugby team to the UK and a return visit by the British Lions rugby team the next year. He was dropped from the Government in 1981 in the wake of Mrs Thatcher's proposal that the British team pull out of the Moscow Olympics, receiving a consolatory knighthood that year. In 1986, he suggested that the government bill the Kremlin in the amount of £1 million and provide the amount to Scottish farmers in compensation for losses to sheep herds caused by the Chernobyl nuclear disaster.

In 1988, a bomb exploded on Pan Am Flight 103, which crashed at Lockerbie, near his home.  He was closely involved in the aftermath as the local constituency MP, and went out to Lockerbie with two other MP's. He was hailed by politicians of all political stripes for his compassion and caring; Scottish Labour MP Brian Wilson praised him as "a man who is truly a part of the community that he represents".

He returned to the Scottish Office on 9 April 1992, but he was sacked from this position on 5 July 1995. He became a member of the Privy Council in 1995, and following his retirement as an MP, was made a life peer as Baron Monro of Langholm, of Westerkirk in Dumfries and Galloway on 6 November 1997.

The number of Conservative MPs from Scotland declined from 24 when he was first elected an MP in 1964 to nil after the 1997 general election.  A One Nation Conservative, he occasionally rebelled against the official party line, opposing the closing of British Steel Corporation's Ravenscraig steelworks, for example.  One of his Labour Party opponents, Norman Hogg, dubbed him "the last of the decent Tories".

Outside politics
Monro was a president of the Scottish Rugby Union, and he was honorary president of Langholm RFC for over 20 years. He managed the 1970  rugby union tour to Australia but had to return home to fight the 1970 General Election.

He was a long-serving member of the Nature Conservancy Council, and active in the National Farmers Union of Scotland. He was a member of the Royal Company of Archers, a deputy lieutenant of Dumfriesshire, and enjoyed vintage cars and country sports.

Arms

Notes

References
Obituary, The Times, 31 August 2006
Obituary, The Daily Telegraph, 31 August 2006
Obituary, The Independent, 1 September 2006
Obituary, The Guardian, 1 September 2006

External links
 
 Announcement of his death at the House of Lords House of Lords minutes of proceedings, 9 October 2006

1922 births
2006 deaths
People educated at Canford School
Royal Air Force officers
Royal Air Force pilots of World War II
British World War II bomber pilots
Members of the Privy Council of the United Kingdom
Unionist Party (Scotland) MPs
Scottish Conservative Party MPs
Monro of Langholm
Life peers created by Elizabeth II
Unionist Party (Scotland) councillors
Alumni of King's College, Cambridge
UK MPs 1964–1966
UK MPs 1966–1970
UK MPs 1970–1974
UK MPs 1974
UK MPs 1974–1979
UK MPs 1979–1983
UK MPs 1983–1987
UK MPs 1987–1992
UK MPs 1992–1997
Members of the Royal Company of Archers
Presidents of the Scottish Rugby Union